Alathiyur may refer to any of the following places in India:

 Alathiyur, Ariyalur, Tamil Nadu
 Alathiyur, Malappuram, Kerala